This is a list of countries by 4G LTE penetration.

2021 rankings
The following is a list of countries/territories by 4G LTE coverage as measured by SpeedChecker in 2021.

2019 Q1 rankings
The following is a list of countries/territories by 4G LTE coverage as measured by OpenSignal.com in January, February and March 2019.

2017 Q4 rankings
The following is a list of countries/territories by 4G LTE coverage as measured by OpenSignal.com in October, November and December 2017.

2017 Q1 rankings
The following is a list of countries/territories by 4G LTE coverage as measured by OpenSignal.com in 2017 Q1.

2016 November rankings
The following is a list of countries/territories by 4G LTE coverage as measured by OpenSignal.com in 2016 November.

2015 Q4 rankings
The following is a list of countries/territories by 4G LTE coverage as measured by OpenSignal.com in 2015 Q4.

2015 Q3 rankings
The following is a list of countries/territories by 4G LTE coverage as measured by OpenSignal.com in 2015 Q3.

2013 rankings
The following is a list of countries by 4G LTE coverage as measured by Juniper Networks in 2013 and published by Bloomberg.

See also 
List of countries by Internet connection speeds
List of countries by smartphone penetration
List of countries by number of mobile phones in use
List of mobile network operators
List of countries by number of Internet users

References 

4G LTE
4G LTE
 4G
4G LTE penetration
Countries